Juan Nepomuceno Seguín (October 27, 1806 – August 27, 1890) was a Spanish-Tejano political and military figure of the Texas Revolution who helped to establish the independence of Texas. Numerous places and institutions are named in his honor, including the county seat of Seguin in Guadalupe County, the Juan N. Seguin Memorial Interchange in Houston, Juan Seguin Monument in Seguin, World War II Liberty Ship SS Juan N. Seguin, Seguin High School in Arlington.

Early life
Juan Nepomuceno Seguin was born on October 27, 1806, in San Antonio de Bexar, Province of Texas, Viceroyalty of New Spain,  to Juan José María Erasmo Seguin and Maria Josefa Becerra (Spaniards from the Canary Islands). As the son of a postal administrator, he would help his mother in business, while his father was one of the drafting rapporteurs for the Mexican Constitution of 1824. In 1825, Seguin married María Gertrudis Flores de Abrego. They had ten children. He was elected an alderman in December, 1828 and served on numerous electoral boards before becoming the San Antonio alcalde (mayor) in December 1833. He then served as political chief of Bexar in 1834, when the previous chief became ill. In 1835, he led a relief force to Monclova, when the Federalist Governor appealed for help.

Texas Revolution

As a teenager in Mexico, he had a strong interest in politics. While Antonio López de Santa Anna repealed the Mexican Constitution of 1824, Seguín was very critical of his contemporary Mexican leader. Years later Seguín gladly joined the Texas Revolution to rid the area of Santa Anna's rule. In 1835–1836, Seguín recruited and commanded troops for the Texian Army. He was commissioned a captain by Stephen F. Austin in October 1835 and was tasked with supplying the Texian troops with food and provisions. Seguín sent out scouting parties to the Missions of San Antonio in search of a suitable base camp for the Texians  and participated in the early successful Battle of Concepcion.

Martín Perfecto de Cos was appointed as military governor over Texas by his brother-in-law Antonio López de Santa Anna, and established his headquarters in San Antonio on October 9, 1835. Upwards of 160 rancheros (Mexican ranch owners) and other Tejanos under Seguín, José Carbajal, Plácido Benavides, Salvador Flores and Manuel Leal joined Austin and approximately 400 Texians at the Siege of Béxar. After a two-month battle, Cos surrendered on December 9.

In January 1836, Seguín was commissioned as a captain in the regular Texas army. Upon the return of Santa Anna's army, Seguín joined William B. Travis on February 23, in the Battle of the Alamo. Although serving at the Alamo during the thirteen-day siege, he did not actually participate in the final battle of the Alamo.  He was chosen to carry the Alamo message through enemy lines, that the Texans "shall never surrender or retreat." Seguín got that message through to the other soldiers on the Texian side. He then returned with men to reinforce the Alamo, but it had already fallen to Santa Anna's army.

After the Alamo, he re-formed cavalry companies at Gonzales and acted as the rear guard, providing protection for fleeing Texas families during the Runaway Scrape. His company, with Captain Moseley Baker's company, blocked the Mexican army from crossing the Brazos River, preventing them from overtaking the Texians. His cavalry command, participating as infantry with Sherman's company, fought in the victorious Battle of San Jacinto. In May 1836, he was promoted to lieutenant colonel. On June 4, as a representative of the Republic of Texas, he accepted the formal surrender of the Mexican forces in the Alamo.

Life under the Republic of Texas
After Texas became a  Republic, he was the head of the San Antonio military, commanding a force to defend the western frontier. Texas army Brigadier General Felix Huston ordered Seguín in early 1837 to arrange for burial of the Alamo defenders' remains that had been left where they were burned. Ashes were identified and collected at three unrecorded sites. Prior to the February 25 funeral, the casket lay in "the parish church". An account provided by Seguin, in the March 28, 1837 issue of the Telegraph and Texas Register, states they were buried where the majority of ashes had been found, but was not specific about the location. He told historian Reuben Potter in 1861 that the site was in a peach orchard near the mission. Twenty-eight years later in correspondence with Hamilton P. Bee, Seguín remembered placing the remains in a tomb inside the "Cathedral of San Antonio". Remains believed to be those of the Alamo defenders were discovered at the Cathedral of San Fernando in 1936, the battle's centennial. Time had decayed their original container, and they were re-interred in a marble sarcophagus. Purported to hold the ashes of Travis, Bowie and Crockett, some have doubted it can be proven whose remains are actually entombed there.

Seguín was elected as a Texas Senator from 1837 to 1840 and worked closely with Congressman José Antonio Navarro to ensure legislation that would be in the best interest of the citizenry of Texas, who were quickly becoming the political minority. In 1839, Seguín, captain of a Texas force of about fifty-four men, again protected the colonists in the Henry Karnes campaign against the hostile Comanche Indians.  In 1839, at a town thirty miles east of San Antonio, he was honored by parade and celebration; that newly named town would now bear his own name, Seguin. In 1840, he resigned his congressional seat in order to join a controversial campaign against the Centralist government in Mexico City.  He became mayor of San Antonio in 1841.

Texas became flooded with adventurous and land-hungry North Americans who were unfamiliar with the native Texans' history and their loyal support of Texas. Seguin's leadership and loyalty was challenged by these newcomers. Refusing to burn San Antonio to the ground by order of the new head of the Texas military was just the beginning.

In 1842, San Antonio was overrun by Santa Anna's forces. During March 1842, Colonel Seguin and the citizens of San Antonio sought refuge at Manuel Flores' Ranch in the city of Seguin, Texas. A counterattack was planned, and even though Seguín pursued the army of Ráfael Vásquez, chasing them from Texas, he was deemed to be to blame for the attack.

Seguín resigned from office in April, due to threats on his life.  Opposition to his defense of Texas rights, adversities, and false charges that he was aiding the Mexican army proved too much to bear. He fled to Mexico to "seek refuge amongst my enemies," where he was captured, arrested and coerced to enlist in the Mexican army as a staff officer. He returned to San Antonio with the opposition army of Adrian Woll in September 1842 and later served under Santa Anna in the Mexican–American War of 1846–1848.

Later life
In February 1848, Seguín requested permission to return to Texas. By the year's end, he had returned, building a home in 1852; adjacent to his father Erasmo Seguín's house, and ranching in Floresville, Texas. He was elected to two terms as Justice of the Peace of Bexar County in 1852 and 1854, and became a founding father of the Democratic Party in Bexar county. In 1858, he published his life memoirs. Seguín served as County Judge in Wilson County in 1869. However, business dealings occasionally took him back to Mexico, and in around 1883 he settled in Nuevo Laredo, Tamaulipas, Mexico, to be near his son Santiago, who was mayor. He died there on August 27, 1890. His remains were returned to Texas in 1974 and as part of the nation's Bicentennial celebration were reinterred in his namesake town, Seguin, during ceremonies on July 4, 1976. A large monument, depicting him on horseback waving his saber, now honors his service to Texas, in the downtown Seguin Central Park.

Legacy

1838 –  Walnut Springs in Guadalupe County, Texas was renamed Seguin.
1908–2010 –  Juan Seguin School (a.k.a. Juan Seguin Elementary School), Guadalupe County, originally established for children of Mexico's refugees from the Mexican Revolution.
June 13, 2001 – Juan N. Seguin Memorial Interchange, State Highway 225 between Houston and La Porte, HB3460 designated by the 77th Regular Session, 2001 of the Texas State Legislature
June 13, 2001 – Juan N. Seguin Boulevard, Park Road 1836 between Independence Parkway and the San Jacinto Battleground
October 28, 2000 – A statue of Juan N. Seguin sculpted by Erik Christianson of Bulverde was erected in the public square south of the courthouse in the city of Seguin.
War II Liberty Ship , Hull No. 2934.  The builder's plaque and ships bell from Juan N. Seguin hangs inside the city hall in Seguin.
Juan Seguin High School - Arlington ISD.
Juan Seguin Elementary Fort Bend Independent School District
Juan Seguin Elementary, McAllen ISD, McAllen, TX
Juan Seguin Early Childhood Center, Lamar CISD, Richmond, Texas
Juan Seguin Elementary, La Joya Independent School District, Mission, Hidalgo County
2007– Seguin Circle , River Bend Golf Club , Floresville, Texas Commemorates exact location of the home Juan Seguin built next to his father Erasmo, in Floresville.
October 25, 2014 Juan Seguin Texas Ranger memorial placed near grave in Seguin, Texas dedicated by Former Texas Rangers Association.
Juan N. Seguin Elementary School in Eagle Pass. Formerly called Robert E. Lee Elementary School.

In popular culture

Film and TV
1955 – The Last Command, portrayed by Edward Colmans.
1960 – The Alamo, portrayed by Joseph Calleia.
1982 – American Playhouse: Seguin, portrayed by A Martinez and written by Jesús Salvador Treviño.
 1986 – Gone to Texas (retitled from Houston: The Legend of Texas), portrayed by Peter Gonzales Falcon.
1987 – The Alamo: 13 Days to Glory, portrayed by Michael Wren.
1988 – Alamo: The Price of Freedom, portrayed by Derek Caballero.
1994 – James A. Michener's Texas, portrayed by Roland Rodriguez.
2004 – The Alamo, portrayed by Jordi Molla.
2015 – Texas Rising, portrayed by Raúl Méndez

Books
2012 –  The novel Los Tejanos and Lost Cause, a fictionalized imagining of Seguin's perspective on the Mexican–American War.

Tejanos who served under Juan Seguín

See also
Erasmo Seguín, Juan's father

Notes

Footnotes

Citations

Bibliography

Further reading

External links

 
 Seguin Descendants Historical Preservation
 Remember the Alamo, PBS American Experience (2004) Alamo/timeline/1835
 The West, PBS (2001), Juan Seguin 

1806 births
1890 deaths
People of Spanish Texas
People of the Texas Revolution
Army of the Republic of Texas officers
Alamo defenders
Alamo survivors
Republic of Texas Senators
Texas Democrats
19th-century American politicians
Mayors of San Antonio
People from Floresville, Texas
People from Laredo, Texas
People from Nuevo Laredo
People from San Antonio
People from Wilson County, Texas
Tejano politicians
Hispanic and Latino American mayors